One Day I'll Be on Time is the second album by The Album Leaf.

Track listing

Personnel
Jimmy LaValle – producer, engineer, mixing, instrumentation
Rafter Roberts – engineer, drum programming, mastering

References

2001 albums
The Album Leaf albums